Raymond Lee Walls Jr. (January 6, 1933 – October 11, 1993) was an American professional baseball player, an outfielder who appeared in Major League Baseball (MLB) between  and  as a member of the Pittsburgh Pirates, Chicago Cubs, Cincinnati Reds, Philadelphia Phillies and Los Angeles Dodgers. He also played the 1965 season in Japan, for the Hankyu Braves. Walls wore eyeglasses on the field during his active career — a rarity for players of his era — and was nicknamed "Captain Midnight" because of his eyewear.

Playing career
Walls graduated from Pasadena High School and attended Pasadena City College. He signed with the Pirates in 1951. In , his first full MLB season, Walls batted .274 with 11 triples (third in the National League), 11 home runs and 54 RBIs. On July 2, Walls—by this time a member of the Cubs—hit for the cycle in an 8–6 loss to Cincinnati at Wrigley Field. It was the highlight of a poor sophomore season for Walls, with his batting average dropping to .237 in 125 games played.

The next season, proved to be Walls' best year. Playing as the Cubs' regular right fielder, Walls reached career highs in hits (156), home runs (24), RBIs (72) and batting average (.304) in 136 games played. On April 24, against the newly relocated Dodgers at the Los Angeles Memorial Coliseum, minutes down the freeway from his hometown of Pasadena, Walls hit three home runs and had eight RBIs in a 15–2 Chicago rout.  Selected to the National League All-Star team as a reserve, he pinch hit for the Pirates' Bob Skinner in the seventh inning and grounded out against Billy O'Dell. Walls stayed in the game to play left field, but that was his only plate appearance as the American League won, 4–3, at Baltimore's Memorial Stadium.

Walls played all three games of the 1962 National League tie-breaker series, including a Game 1 start at first base, and contributed a pinch double in Game 2 (coincidentally, off O'Dell), driving home three RBIs to spark a crucial, seven-run Los Angeles rally. By winning, 8–7, the Dodgers staved off elimination and extended the series to a decisive third contest. The next day, however, the Dodgers fell to the Giants in the ninth and final inning. Walls, pinch hitting for Larry Burright, made the final out, lining to center fielder Willie Mays.

The following year, Walls was a member of the world champion Dodgers, but did not appear in his club's four-game sweep of the New York Yankees in the 1963 World Series.  In 902 total games played over ten National League seasons, Walls collected  670 hits, with 88 doubles, 31 triples and 66 homers. After spending 1965 playing baseball in Japan, Walls retired as an active player.

Later career
A decade and a half after his last appearance for the Dodgers, Walls returned to MLB as a coach for the Oakland Athletics (1979–82) and Yankees (1983), working primarily for Billy Martin, a teammate on the 1960 Reds. He also worked as a minor league manager.  He died in Los Angeles at the age of 60 after suffering from liver disease.

See also
 List of Major League Baseball players to hit for the cycle

References

External links

Lee Walls at SABR (Baseball BioProject)
Cartoon of Lee Walls in the St. Petersburg Times (June 7, 1958) via Google News

1933 births
1993 deaths
American expatriate baseball players in Japan
Baseball players from Pasadena, California
Baseball players from San Diego
Chicago Cubs players
Cincinnati Reds players
Hankyu Braves players
Hollywood Stars players
Los Angeles Dodgers players
Major League Baseball first base coaches
Major League Baseball outfielders
Major League Baseball right fielders
Modesto Reds players
Nashville Sounds managers
National League All-Stars
New York Yankees coaches
Oakland Athletics coaches
Pasadena City College alumni
Pasadena High School (California) alumni
Philadelphia Phillies players
Pittsburgh Pirates players
Sportspeople from Pasadena, California
Waco Pirates players